The Haunted Storm (1972) is author Philip Pullman's first book. He was only 25 at the time and it was "published by a publisher who didn't realise it wasn't a very good book". The Haunted Storm became joint winner of the New English Library's Young Writer's Award in 1972.

Characters
Matthew Cortez.
Elizabeth Cole.

Plot summary
Unease and suspicion divide a small village following violence and death. Matthew Cortez is physically involved in the investigation, finding his spiritual problems have a greater depth of reality. Only in the final disastrous confrontation in a ruined Mithraic temple does he, at last, glimpse the possibility of peace.

The book was described by Antonia Fraser as an "honest and enterprising attempt to interweave the eternal and immortal longings of youth into the texture of a contemporary story".

Themes
Gnosticism.

References

1972 British novels
Novels by Philip Pullman
1972 debut novels
New English Library books